This is an incomplete list of festivals in Edmonton, a city in the province of Alberta, Canada. Edmonton plays host to several large festivals each year, hence its local nickname as 'the Festival City.'

This list includes festivals of diverse types, including regional festivals, commerce festivals, fairs, food festivals, arts festivals, religious festivals, folk festivals, and recurring festivals on holidays.

List of festivals

Former festivals
 Carnival of Shrieking Youth
 HarvestMoon Music and Arts Festival
 Interstellar Rodeo

See also
 
List of festivals in Alberta
List of festivals in Canada
List of attractions and landmarks in Edmonton

References

External links

Edmonton tourism
Edmonton Festival City

and
Festivals
Edmonto